The 2015 Craven District Council election took place on 7 May 2015 to elect members of the Craven District Council in England. It was held on the same day as other local elections.

By-elections between 2015 and 2016
A by-election was held in Embsay-with-Eastby on 31 March 2016 after the death of Conservative councillor Andy Quinn. The seat was won by independent candidate Brian Shuttleworth.

References

2015 English local elections
May 2015 events in the United Kingdom
2015
2010s in North Yorkshire